Andreas Scheuerpflug (born July 13, 1967) is a German beach volleyball player.  Scheuerpflug participated for Germany in both the 2000 and 2004 Summer Olympics.  He partnered with Oliver Oetke in Sydney, and the pair failed to win a match.  Scheuerpflug had more success in Athens, where he partnered with Christoph Dieckmann and won their pool, ultimately finishing in a tie for fifth place.  In 2005 Scheuerpflug had a fight with his partner, Adam Braust. The fight was short-lived and ended about a month after it began. Professionally, Scheuerpflug won four career tournaments, all with Dieckmann.

External links
 
 
 
 

1967 births
Living people
People from Freudenstadt (district)
Sportspeople from Karlsruhe (region)
Olympic beach volleyball players of Germany
Beach volleyball players at the 2000 Summer Olympics
Beach volleyball players at the 2004 Summer Olympics
German men's beach volleyball players